Gilles de Corbeil (Latin: Egidius de Corbolio or Egidius Corboliensis; also Aegidius) was a French royal physician, teacher, and poet.  He was born in approximately 1140 in Corbeil and died in the first quarter of the 13th century.  He is the author of four medical poems and a scathing anti-clerical satire, all in Latin dactylic hexameters.

Life and works

Education and 
Gilles de Corbeil was born in Corbeil-Essonnes.  He studied at the Schola Medica Salernitana, absorbing its theories and practices and becoming a teacher himself.  He praises his teachers Romuald Guarna and Peter Musandinus (in turn the student of Bartholomew of Salerno) in his long poem (four books and 4,663 verses) of ca. 1194 on Salernitan drug therapy, .  He complains, however, of the school's degeneration after the sack of Salerno in 1194 by Henry VI, Holy Roman Emperor, and in the same poem he criticizes its "granting medical degrees, and consequently a license to lecture, to unlearned and inexperienced youths."

Paris and Montpellier
He returned to Paris between ca. 1180 and 1194, becoming a canon and the court physician to Philip II of France. He proudly presented himself as a pioneer of academic medicine in France, upholding the prestige of the Salernitan medicine over rivals such as the Montpellier school and the "empiric" Rigord. Gilles of Corbeil is the only teacher namely known of the University of Paris where he became a magister in the end of the 12th century.

Poems for students:  and 
They became didactic classics and were widely studied, copied, and commented upon.

This poem of 2,358 verses, not printed until 1907, deals with the signs and symptoms of humoral excess and diseases (organized from head to foot), proceeding to "sections on gynecological disorders and on whole-body diseases such as arthritis, leprosy, and fevers."

His Laxative for Purging Prelates (a Salerno glossary explains  literally as "sacred and bitter medicine," , from Greek , often used for a special pharmacological recipe, and ), a satire in nine books and 5,929 verses, was discovered in 1837 among manuscripts deriving from the library of Pierre Pithou.  It particularly targets Guala Bicchieri but takes aim more generally at the abuses prevalent among ecclesiastical officials. In a prologue, the poet invokes, not a Muse, but a pope (apparently Innocent III), from whom he hopes to receive the antidote that can cure the morally sick prelates.

Editions
 Johann Ludwig Choulant, Leipzig, 1826 (online)
 Camille Vieillard, L'urologie et les médecins urologues dans la médecine ancienne: Gilles de Corbeil, Paris, 1903 (online)
 Valentin Rose, Teubner, 1907, editio princeps (online)
 Dieter Scheler, Die , Teildruck Phil. Diss. Würzburg, Bochum, 1972

Translations

Edward Grant, Harvard University Press, 1974, pp. 748–50), is reprinted in Medieval Medicine: A Reader, ed. Faith Wallis, University of Toronto Press, 2010, pp. 256-258

Notes

12th-century births
13th-century deaths
13th-century French physicians
French medical writers
Medieval Latin poets
Schola Medica Salernitana
12th-century French writers
13th-century French writers
12th-century French poets
13th-century French poets
12th-century French physicians
12th-century Latin writers
13th-century Latin writers